Pwll Dwfn is a cave in the Black Mountain, South Wales. It is located in a dry valley northwest of Dan yr Ogof and cavers can access it from the show cave's car park. The entrance is not gated.

Pwll Dwfn is one of the few caves in the area which requires single rope technique (SRT). The pot itself consists of five pitches totalling  from top to bottom.

The cave is terminated by two static sumps and has colonial coral fossils on the walls.

Sources
 

Swansea Valley
Caves of Powys